William Michael Gear, better known as W. Michael Gear, (born May 20, 1955) is an American writer and archaeologist. He is the author of North America's Forgotten Past series, co-written with wife Kathleen O'Neal Gear.

Biography
Gear was born in Colorado Springs, Colorado.  He's published sixty novels that have been translated into twenty-nine languages. He is best known for his North America's Forgotten Past series, co-authored with Kathleen O'Neal Gear, about North American prehistory. He received his B.A. (1976) and M.A. (1979) from Colorado State University. Upon completion of his Master's in physical anthropology he went to work for Western Wyoming College in Rock Springs, Wyoming as a field archaeologist.

Beginning in 1981, Michael, along with two partners, put together his own archaeological consulting company, Pronghorn Anthropological Associates. The company began doing cultural resource management studies in 1982. After he sold his interest in 1984, he started Wind River Archaeological Consultants with his wife, Kathleen O'Neal Gear.

Gear's writing was inspired by historical inaccuracies he encountered in reading historical fiction. In 1978, after reading a Western novel about a trail drive that was filled with inaccuracies, he began work on his first five hundred and fifty page novel. According to him, it "reads wretchedly - but the historical facts are correct!"

Gear currently resides in Cody, Wyoming along with wife, author and co-writer Kathleen O'Neal Gear.

Notable works
Forbidden Borders trilogy
Requiem for the Conqueror (1991)
Relic of Empire (1992)
Countermeasures (1993)

People Books - First North Americans (with Kathleen O'Neal Gear)
 People of the Wolf (1990)
 People of the Fire (1990)
 People of the Earth (1992)
 People of the River (1992)
 People of the Sea (1993)
 People of the Lakes (1994)
 People of the Lightning (1995)
 People of the Silence (1996)
 People of the Mist (1997)
 People of the Masks (1998)
 People of the Owl (2003)
 People of the Raven (2004) Spur Award Winner.
 People of the Moon (2005) Spur Award Finalist.
 People of the Nightland (2007)
 People of the Weeping Eye (2008)
 People of the Thunder (2009)
 People of the Longhouse (2010)
 The Dawn Country (2011)
 The Broken Land (2012)
 People of the Black Sun (2012)
"Copper Falcon" (2014)--short story
 People of the Morning Star (2014)
"The Dead Man's Doll" (2015)--short story
 People of the Songtrail (2015)
Sun Born (2016)
Moon Hunt (2017) This novel was a Spur Award finalist.
Star Path (2019)
People of the Canyons (2020)
People of Cahokia: Lightning Shell (2022)

 German only 
 Das Ende Aller Tage, Bastei Lübbe #16290 2007, Translator Rainer Schumacher,  (Orig. Comes a Green Sky)
 Der Eden Effekt, Bastei Lübbe #16608 2012, Translator Karin Meddekis,  (Orig. The carbon cauldron)
 Das letzte Gebet, Bastei Lübbe #15748 2007, Translator Rainer Schumacher,  (Orig. To cast a pearl)

Way of Spider
 The Warriors of Spider (1988)
 The Way of Spider (1988)
 The Web of Spider (1989)

The Richard Hamilton Duology
Morning River (1996) 
Coyote Summer (1997)

Anasazi Mysteries (with Kathleen O'Neal Gear)
 The Visitant (1999)
 The Summoning God (2000)
 Bone Walker (2001)

Other Novels
 The Big Horn Legacy (1988)
 Long Ride Home (1988)
 The Artifact (1990)
 Starstrike (1990)
 Dark Inheritance (2001) (with Kathleen O'Neal Gear) 
 Raising Abel (2002) (with Kathleen O'Neal Gear)
 The Athena Factor (2005)
 The Betrayal: The Lost Life of Jesus (2008) (with Kathleen O'Neal Gear)
Children of the Dawnland (2009) (with Kathleen O'Neal Gear)
This Scorched Earth (2018) (as William Gear) 2019 Spur Award finalist.
The Foundation (2021)

The Battle for America series.
Coming of the Storm (2010)
Fire the Sky (2010)
A Searing Wind (2011)

Donovan Series.
Outpost (2018)
Abandoned (2018)
Pariah (2019)
Unreconciled (2020)
Adrift (2021)
Reckoning (2022)

The Wyoming Chronicles
Dissolution (2021)
Fracture Event (2021)

Team Psi Series.
The Alpha Enigma (2020)
Implacable Alpha (2022)

Flight of the Hawk trilogy
The River (2018)
The Plains (2019)

Selected Non-fiction

 The New Bison Genome...and another DNA test: Our opinion, Bison Review Magazine, Winter, 2022. 
 PLC at Work and Your Small School, by Breez Longwell Daniels.  Foreword by W. Michael Gear and Kathleen O'Neal Gear, Solution Tree Press, Bloomington, Indiana, 2020.
 When Buffalo Cry, Roundup Magazine, February, 2020
 Meatless Meat.  What's All the Fuss About? Bison Review, Winter, 2020
 The Power of an Illusion, Bison Review, Summer, 2019
 When Buffalo Cry, Bison Review, Winter, 2017.
 More on the Higgs Bison, Bison Review, Fall, 2016.
 Chunkey: America’s Ancient Game, Cobblestone, October, 2015.
 Morning Star and the Giants, Cobblestone, October, 2015.
 Are Bison Microsatellite DNA Tests Accurate? Bison Review, Winter, 2015.
 Cattle Genes in Bison:  Modern or Ancient?  Bison Review, Winter, 2015.
 The Dead Man’s Doll, Tor Books, April, 2015.
 Vikings in North America, Tor Books, March, 2015.
 A Prehistoric Bison Bone Sculpture.  Bison Review, Summer, 2015.
 Viking Warrior Women: Did ‘Shieldmaidens’ like Lagertha Really Exist? Tor/Forge blog, May, 2015. (Tor.com)
 Wild Bison:  The Search for a Definition of ‘Wild’ Behavior.  Bison Review, Spring, 2014.
 Genetically Modified Bison?  Let’s Not Find out if there is a Health Risk.  Say NO to GMO. Bison Review, Fall, 2013.
 Chimps and Bison:  The ESA Effect. Bison Review, Fall, 2013.
 The Healing Powers of Buffalo in Native America. Bison Review, Spring, 2013.
 Public Comments Letter from WBA to USFWS on Woods Bison Designation. Bison Review, Spring, 2013.
 Western Bison Association—Issues Paper: Conservation Herds vs. Commercial Herds. The Upcoming COSEWIC Report in Canada.  Bison Review, Spring, 2013.
 Petition to Remove Wood Bison from Administration Under the Provisions of the Endangered Species Act. Bison Review, Winter, 2012.
 Hybrids and the Endangered Species Act, Bison Review, Winter, 2012.
 Cattle Genes in Bison: The Perspectives of the WBA. Bison Review, Fall, 2012.
 The Effects of Cattle DNA in Bison: A New Study. Bison Review, Fall, 2012.
 The Global Economic Crises and Food Production: What’s in Store? Bison Review, Fall, 2012.
 Response to Canadian Perspectives. Bison Review, Fall, 2012.
 New change to the NBA Code of Ethics—Our opinion, Bison Review, May, 2012.
 Terminology:  Bison bison or Bos bison.  What does it mean for us? Bison Review, May, 2012.
 Ranchers Efforts to Protect Endangered Species Foiled by Conservation Groups.  Bison Review, May, 2012.
 Historical Uses of Bison. Bison Review, May, 2012.
 Hybrids and the Endangered Species Act. Bison Review, Winter, 2012.
 Western Bison Association’s Petition to Remove Wood Bison from Administration Under the Endangered Species Act. Bison Review, Winter, 2012.
 2011 WBA Conference Overview. Bison Review, Winter, 2012.
 Gene Patents: Why the Bison Industry Needs a Plan for the Bison Genome.  Bison Review, Fall, 2011.
 Paleobiology of Bison, Dakota Territory Buffalo Association Newsletter, Summer, 2011.
 The Pure Bison Debate, Dakota Territory Buffalo Association Newsletter, Summer, 2011.
 Western Bison Association Response to Conservation Committee on Proposed Conservation Guidelines for Herd Managers. Bison Review, May, 2011.
 The Buffalo Primer: An Introduction to the Art and Science of Owning Bison. Part 7.  Bison Review, May, 2011.
 Principles of Evolutionary Biology – and What They Mean for the Purity Issue in Bison, Dakota Territory Buffalo Association Newsletter, Summer, 2011.
 Summary of 12th Annual Stampede, Bison Review, January, 2011.
 Possible Impacts of ‘Pure Bison’ Debate, Bison Review, January, 2011.
 Pure Bison—WBA Management Recommendations, Bison Review, January 2011.
 Western Bison Association Response to Conservation Committee on Proposed Conservation Guidelines for Herd Managers. Bison Review, May, 2011.
 The Buffalo Primer: An Introduction to the Art and Science of Owning Bison. Part 6.  Bison Review, January, 2011.
 Basic  Principles of Evolutionary Biology – and What they Mean for the Purity Issue. Bison Review, Jan. 2011.
 Response to James Derr, Bison Review, January, 2011.
 Lessons from Ancient Egypt. Bison World Magazine, June, 2010.  
 One Bison Skull Helps Rewrite Bison History. The Bison Review, Summer, 2010.
 Lessons from Ancient Egypt. Bison Review, January 2010.
 The Buffalo Primer: An Introduction to the Art and Science of Owning Bison. Part 5.  Nutrition. Bison Review, January, 2010. 
 The Buffalo Primer: An Introduction to the Art and Science of Owning Bison. Part 4.Bison Review, Fall, 2009.
 The Buffalo Primer: An Introduction to the Art and Science of Owning Buffalo.  Part 3: Buying Buffalo. Bison Review, May, 2009.
 How do the Judges Do it? Bison Review, May, 2009.
 The Buffalo Primer: An Introduction to the Art and Science of Owning Buffalo.  Part 2. Bison Review, Fall, 2008.
 Do we really want Bison to be Amenable? Dakota Territory Buffalo Association Newsletter, Fall, 2008.
 Should Bison be an Amenable Species? The Bison Rancher, Fall, 2008.
 The Buffalo Primer: An Introduction to the Art and Science of Owning Buffalo.  Part 1.Bison Review, Summer, 2008.
 The Horsemen of the Apocalypse: Long Version, Bison Review, Summer, 2008.
 Do We Really Want Bison to be an Amenable Species? Bison Review, Summer, 2008.  
 The Horsemen of the Apocalypse, Bison World Magazine, Spring, 2008.
 The Drought, Global Warming, and Our Own Backyards, Western Bison Record, March, 2007.
 Medicinal Usages of Plants by Buffalo. Western Bison Record, November, 2006.
 Prehistoric Sexual Healing Rituals, Romantic Times magazine, May, 2005.
 The Oregon Trail: The Beginning of the End for the Buffalo, Western Bison Record, June, 2005.
 Slipper: The Saga of a Buffalo Bottle-Baby. Western Bison Record, March, 2004.
 Tripping through the Mine Field:  Writing Fiction about Archaeology, The Archaeological Record, November, 2003.
 From Cowboy to Buffalero:  Wyoming Buffalo Ranchers Talk About the Industry, Western Farm, Ranch, and Dairy Magazine, September, 2003.
 Thirty-three Books, Co-Authors and Still Lovers? Romantic Times Magazine, Aug. 2001.
 Bone Walker and The Anasazi Mystery Series. Mystery Readers Journal, 2001.

Awards and honors

List from his personal web page:

1998. Arizola Magnenat Award for encouraging other Wyoming Writers, Wyoming Writers Association.
1998 – People of the Mist, by Kathleen O’Neal Gear and W. Michael Gear, selected as winner of Booklist’s Editor’s Choice Award for “Best Adult Novel for Young Adults.”
1999 Emmie Mygatt Award for dedicated service and commitment to Wyoming Writers Association.
2000 – The Summoning God, by Kathleen O’Neal Gear and W. Michael Gear, selected as one of the Top Ten Books of the Southwest by the Pima County Library Association.
2001 – Bone Walker, by Kathleen O’Neal Gear and W. Michael Gear, selected as one of the Top Ten Books of the Southwest by the Pima County Library Association.
2001 – Western Writers of America “President’s Award” for dedicated service to the organization.
2003 – Western Writers of America “President’s Award” for dedicated service to WWA.
2004 – Western Writers of America “President’s Award” for dedicated service to WWA.
2004 – National Bison Association, "Producer of the Year Award."
2005 – Western Writers of America “President’s Award” for dedicated service to WWA.
2005 – People of the Raven, by Kathleen O’Neal Gear and W. Michael Gear, winner of the Spur Award for the “Best Novel of the West,” Western Writers of America.
2006 – Western Writers of America “President’s Award” for dedicated service to WWA.
2006 – People of the Moon, Spur Award finalist, “Best Novel of the West,” Western Writers of America.
2007 – Western Writers of America “President’s Award” for dedicated service to WWA.
2007 – “Literary Contribution Award” from the Mountain Plains Library Association.
2007 – FFA Pride Award for agricultural education.
2008 – Western Writers of America “President’s Award” for dedicated service to WWA.
2009 – Children of the Dawnland, “Top Choice Award,” Flamingnet.
2009 – National Bison Association, "Producer of the Year Award."
2009 – Dakota Territory Buffalo Association, "Classic Producer's Award."
2009 – Wisconsin Bison Producers Association, "Producer of the Year Award."
2010 – Children of the Dawnland selected by the Kansas National Education Association for the Kansas State Reading Circle for Middle/Junior High School students.
2011 – People of the Masks, Massachusetts Public Library's Readers Connection – They Came Before Us Selection.
2012 – Founders' Award for dedicated service to the Western Bison Association
2013 – The Broken Land selected as the Norfolk Public Library's American Indian Heritage Month Booklist Selection
2018 – Moon Hunt selected as a finalist for the Spur Award in the Best Western Historical Novel category, Western Writers of America
2021 – The Owen Wister Award for lifetime achievement in Western literature https://www.prnewswire.com/news-releases/w-michael-and-kathleen-oneal-gear-to-receive-western-writers-of-americas-owen-wister-award-301215490.html
2021 - W. Michael Gear inducted into the Western Writers Hall of Fame
2021—International Book Award for Best Science Fiction Novel: Unreconciled''.
2022 President's Award, Western Writers of America.
2022 Finalist for the Spur Award from Western Writers of America in the category of Contemporary Western Fiction for DISSOLUTION.

References

External links
http://www.gear-gear.com  (Biography of W. Michael Gear on his official website)

1955 births
Living people
American archaeologists
21st-century American historians
American male non-fiction writers
People from Thermopolis, Wyoming
People from Colorado Springs, Colorado
Novelists from Colorado
Novelists from Wyoming